Camila Alejandra Sáez Oyaneder (born 17 October 1994) is a Chilean professional footballer who plays as a defender for Spanish top league club Deportivo Alavés and the Chile national team.

International career
Sáez represented Chile at the 2010 FIFA U-17 Women's World Cup. At senior level, she scored two goals at the 2018 Copa América Femenina, where Chile qualified to a FIFA Women's World Cup for the first time in its history.

International goals
Scores and results list Chile's goal tally first

References

External links
Camila Sáez at BDFútbol

1994 births
Living people
Sportspeople from Viña del Mar
Chilean women's footballers
Women's association football central defenders
Unión La Calera footballers
Everton de Viña del Mar footballers
Cobreloa footballers
Colo-Colo (women) footballers
Real Madrid Femenino players
Rayo Vallecano Femenino players
Deportivo Alavés Gloriosas players
Primera División (women) players
Chile women's international footballers
Footballers at the 2011 Pan American Games
Pan American Games competitors for Chile
Competitors at the 2014 South American Games
South American Games silver medalists for Chile
South American Games medalists in football
Chilean expatriate women's footballers
Chilean expatriate sportspeople in Spain
Expatriate women's footballers in Spain
2019 FIFA Women's World Cup players
Footballers at the 2020 Summer Olympics
Olympic footballers of Chile